The Iuliu Maniu Square is a major plaza in the Romanian city of Zalău.

It was named successively Kossuth Square and Freedom Square. The square shelters the most important banks in the county: BCR and Generali.

Gallery

References

External links
 Piata Iuliu Maniu. Iuliu Maniu Square. (Zalău) 

Squares in Romania
Historic monuments in Sălaj County
Zalău
Buildings and structures in Sălaj County